Miss Europe 1973 was the 36th edition of the Miss Europe pageant and the 25th edition under the Mondial Events Organization. It was held in Kitzbühel, Austria on 13 January 1974. Anna "Anke" Maria Groot of Holland, was crowned Miss Europe 1973 by outgoing titleholder Monika Sarp of Germany.

Results

Placements

Special awards

Contestants 

 - Roswitha Kobald
 - Christiane Devisch
 - Helena Siakou
 - Zoe Spink
 - Raija Kaarina Stark
 - Isabelle Nadia Krumacker
 - Ingeborg Martin
 Greece - Sicta Vana Papadaki
 - Anna "Anke" Maria Groot
 - Pauline Theresa Fitzsimons
 - Patrizia Castaldi
 - Lydia Maes
 - Carla Luisa dos Santos Paiva Barros
 - Amparo Muñoz Quesada
 - Christine Göthlander
 - Barbara Schöttli
 - Nuray Belbüken
 - Snežana Milojević

Notes

Withdrawals

 - Nina Breidfjord (not permitted by her parents)

 - Aina Walle (got married)

"Comité Officiel et International Miss Europe" Competition

From 1951 to 2002 there was a rival Miss Europe competition organized by the "Comité Officiel et International Miss Europe". This was founded in 1950 by Jean Raibaut in Paris, the headquarters later moved to Marseille. The winners wore different titles like Miss Europe, Miss Europa or Miss Europe International.

This year, the contest took place in Barcelona, Spain on 24 June 1973. There 16 contestants all representing different countries and regions of Europe. At the end, Diana Scapolan of Italy was crowned as Miss Europa 1973.

Placements

Special awards

Miss Tourism Europe

Contestants

 - UNKNOWN
 - UNKNOWN
 - Teliziana Altieri
 - Bogina Adryva
 - Anne-Elisabeth Schäfer
 - Aleth Mosson
 - Linda Hooks
 - Helene Sibiropoulos (Eleni Sidiropoulou)
 - UNKNOWN
 - Diana Scapolan
 - UNKNOWN
 Mediterranean - UNKNOWN
 - Veronique Mercier
 - Elisabeth Krabbe
 - Laurence Erhart
 - Milene Birkic (Milena Brkić)

Notes

Withdrawals

Replacements
 - Nadine Benoit

References

External links 
 

Miss Europe
1973 beauty pageants
1974 beauty pageants
1973 in Spain
1974 in Austria